The German School of Thessaoloniki is a German international school in Finikas, Thessaloniki, Greece. The school serves Kindergarten through Year 12 of Sekundarstufe II/Lykeion (senior high school/sixth form).

It was established on 13 February 1888, in Salonika, Salonika Vilayet, Ottoman Empire.

See also
 Education in the Ottoman Empire

References

External links

  Deutsche Schule Thessaloniki
  Deutsche Schule Thessaloniki

International schools in Thessaloniki
Thessaloniki
1888 establishments in the Ottoman Empire
Educational institutions established in 1888